Alexander Gibson may refer to:

 Alexander Gibson, Lord Durie I (died 1644), Scottish judge
 Alexander Gibson, Lord Durie II (died 1656), Scottish judge, son of Alexander Gibson, Lord Durie I
 Alexander Gibson (botanist) (1800–1867), botanist and forester in India
 Alexander Craig Gibson (1813–1874), folklorist around Coniston, Cumbria
 Alexander Gibson (conductor) (1926–1995), Scottish conductor and music director
 Alexander Gibson (industrialist) (1819–1913), Canadian industrialist
 Alexander Gibson (politician) (1852–1920), Canadian politician
 Alexander George Gibson (1875–1950), English physician
 Alexander James Gibson (1876–1960), professor of engineering at University of Queensland in Australia

See also 
 Alex Gibson (disambiguation)